Diadasiopus is a genus of mites in the family Acaridae.

Species
 Diadasiopus alexanderi O'Connor & Daneshvar, 1999
 Diadasiopus eickworti O'Connor, 1997

References

Acaridae